Magnum Air (SkyJet), Inc., operating as SkyJet Airlines (styled as SKYJET Airlines), is a Philippine low-cost regional airline based in Manila, Philippines. Previously an air charter company, SkyJet commenced commercial operations on 14 December 2012, offering direct flights from Manila to underserved destinations, particularly, Basco, Batanes; Coron, Palawan; San Vicente, Palawan; and Camiguin. It bills itself as the first boutique airline in the Philippines.

History
Filipino dentist Dr. Joel Mendoza established SkyJet Airlines in September 2005 as an air charter company offering flights aboard its fleet of British Aerospace 146 planes to group tourists going to the northern Philippine province of Batanes. After the Civil Aviation Authority of the Philippines (CAAP) granted the company a temporary air operator's certificate (AOC) to operate commercial scheduled domestic and international routes on 3 August 2012, the airline commenced commercial operations on 14 December 2012. Its inaugural commercial flight was from Manila to Basco Airport in Batanes. On 15 February 2013, the airline began regular flights four times a week from Manila to Busuanga, Palawan, the gateway to the popular tourist destination of Coron.

In December 2013, SkyJet underwent a change in its corporate management after a group of investors led by entrepreneur and Cavite provincial board member Dino Reyes Chua took over the company. Chua took over as president and chief executive officer from Mendoza, who remained chairperson of the board. Under the new management, the airline dropped its plans to launch flights to Virac, Catanduanes and instead started regular flights three times a week from Manila to Boracay via Caticlan Airport on 14 April 2014.

In 2014, SkyJet created controversy in Taiwan after it abruptly aborted its inaugural flight to the country. The airline initially announced an offer of charter flights from Kalibo International Airport in Kalibo, Aklan to Taiwan Taoyuan International Airport between 15 and 31 August. However, the inaugural charter flight was aborted by the company out of concern for the passengers' safety, this after the pilot detected abnormalities in the plane that caused a malfunction. Around 200 Taiwanese tourists in four tour groups were stranded on the island resort of Boracay because of the incident. The aborted flight would have the airline's first international flight; it ultimately decided to halt the route.

In January 2017, SkyJet announced that it would commence flights to Siargao on 24 February 2017. The direct flight from Manila would take tourists to the surfing capital of the Philippines four times a week. However, following an incident wherein one of the airline's planes overshot the runway at Sayak Airport in Siargao (see below), SkyJet temporarily suspended flights to the island. On 18 January 2020, the airline announced that would resume its flights to the island on 29 March 2020, but on 15 March 2020, the airline suspended it again until 31 August 2020 due to the Enhanced Community Quarantine brought about of the COVID-19 pandemic in the Philippines.

On 6 May 2019, Skyjet launched regular daily flights (except Tuesdays and Wednesdays) from Manila to Camiguin, an island province in Mindanao.
 The airline also launched its inaugural flight to San Vicente, Palawan on 16 July 2019.

Acquisition by Solar Group

In March 2015, Thunder Air Aviation Inc., the aviation arm of the media conglomerate Solar Group, which is owned by the Filipino-Chinese Tieng family, acquired a 50-percent controlling stake over SkyJet. Solar Group founder and chairman Wilson Tieng became the new chairman of the airline, while Chua, who had a 20-percent stake remained president and CEO. In December 2016, Mendoza filed a syndicated estafa case against Tieng, Chua and several other officials of SkyJet for allegedly conspiring to defraud him of his shares in the company.

On 18 May 2015, the CAAP suspended SkyJet's air operator's certificate due to various safety shortcomings on the rules and standards prescribed under the Philippine Civil Aviation Regulations (PCAR). These shortcomings were mentioned in the report by the European Union Assessment Team that visited the Philippines and inspected the airline from 16 to 24 April 2015. SkyJet filed a case against the CAAP for the abrupt suspension, which it said was "irregular, not valid, and issued without due process of law", and sought PH₱20 million in damages. On 22 May 2015, the Pasay Regional Trial Court Branch 119 issued a temporary restraining order against SkyJet's suspension. However, on 3 June 2015, the airline announced that it would withdraw its case against CAAP and volunteered to ground its entire fleet beginning 4 June 2015 to give way for CAAP to conduct reevaluation and assessment of the airline's safety. The airline resumed commercial operations after the CAAP lifted the suspension order on 7 June 2015 following the airline's compliance to safety requirements.

On 16 July 2018, the Bureau of Customs ordered the forfeiture of one of SkyJet's BAE 146-100 planes after the airline failed to pay PH₱90 million in duties and taxes to the government since its importation. In February 2020, SkyJet received a leased ATR 72-500 from Elix Aviation Capital to replace the aircraft that the government confiscated as it moves forward with its expansion plans.

Destinations
SkyJet operates to the following destinations within the Philippines:

Fleet

As of July 2019, SkyJet's fleet included the following aircraft:

Accidents and incidents
 On October 19, 2013, a SkyJet aircraft, on a flight chartered by Alphaland Corporation to bring tourists to Balesin Island, overshot the runway of E. L. Tordesillas Airport in Balesin. No injuries were reported but the aircraft was damaged beyond repair.
 On February 27, 2018, a SkyJet aircraft overshot the runway of Sayak Airport in Del Carmen, Surigao del Norte. All 73 passengers and four crew members evacuated the aircraft unharmed. The cause of the incident is currently under investigation, but the CAAP is noting a possible bird strike after one of the passengers reported that the pilot attempted to dodge a passing eagle.
 On June 8, 2018, SkyJet Flight 717 from Manila overshot the runway of Francisco B. Reyes Airport in Coron, Palawan. All 80 passengers and 6 crew members that were on the flight were unharmed. According to an initial report of the Civil Aviation Authority of the Philippines (CAAP), the plane overshot the runway when it was landing and ended up in a field east of the airport.

References

External links
 

Defunct airlines of the Philippines
Companies based in Pasig
Airlines established in 2005
Airlines formerly banned in the European Union
Philippine companies established in 2005
Airlines disestablished in 2012